The Admiralty Building is the former headquarters of the Admiralty Board and the Imperial Russian Navy in Central St. Petersburg, Russia and the current headquarters of the Russian Navy.

The edifice was rebuilt in the nineteenth century to support the Tsar's maritime ambitions. The original design was a fortified shipyard which was later surrounded by five bastions and further protected by a moat.

The Empire Style edifice visible today lining the Admiralty Quay was constructed to Andreyan Zakharov's design between 1806 and 1823. Located at the western end of the Nevsky Prospekt, The Admiralty with its gilded spire topped by a golden weather-vane in the shape of a small sail warship (Korablik), is one of the city's most conspicuous landmarks and  the focal point of old St. Petersburg's three main streets - Nevsky Prospect, Gorokhovaya Street, and Voznesensky Avenue - underscoring the importance Peter I placed on Russia's Navy.

Until merger and relocation to the town of Pushkin in 1998 the building housed  which since 1927 was named after Felix Dzerzhinsky.

Vladimir Nabokov, writer and native of St. Petersburg, wrote a short story in May 1933 entitled "The Admiralty Spire."

See also
Admiralty Embankment with the Lions at the Dvortsovaya pier

References

External links

Buildings and structures in Saint Petersburg
Russian Navy
Tourist attractions in Saint Petersburg
Government buildings completed in 1823
Neoclassical architecture in Russia
Cultural heritage monuments of federal significance in Saint Petersburg